Juanfernandezia is a monotypic genus of South American dwarf spiders containing the single species, Juanfernandezia melanocephala. It was first described by A. Ö. Koçak & M. Kemal in 2008, and has only been found in Chile.

See also
 List of Linyphiidae species (I–P)

References

Linyphiidae
Monotypic Araneomorphae genera
Spiders of South America
Endemic fauna of Chile